Chega de Saudade may refer to:

Chega de Saudade, a 1958 Bossa Nova song by João Gilberto
Chega de Saudade (album), a 1959 album by João Gilberto
Chega de Saudade (film), a 2007 Brazilian film